Tuszymka is a river in south-eastern Poland, a tributary of the Wisłoka river, with a length of . The source of the river is near the village of Bukowiec. The river runs near the village of Kamionka where there is a lake.

Towns and villages around Tuszymka

See also
Rivers of Poland

Rivers of Poland
Rivers of Podkarpackie Voivodeship